Bad Blood may refer to:

Film and television

Films
 Bad Blood (1981 film), a British-New Zealand thriller by Mike Newell
 Bad Blood (1986 film) (Mauvais Sang), a French film by Leos Carax
 Bad Blood, a 1999 British television film written by Tony Marchant
 Bad Blood (2010 film), a Hong Kong crime film by Dennis Law
 Bad Blood: A Cautionary Tale, a 2010 American documentary by Marilyn Ness
 Bad Blood (2011 film), an American drama by Michael Yebba
 Bad Blood (2017 film), an Australian thriller film by David Pulbrook
 Batman: Bad Blood, a 2016 animated superhero film

Television
 Bad Blood (TV series), a 2017–2018 Canadian TV series
 WWE Bad Blood, a professional wrestling pay-per-view event

Episodes
 "Bad Blood" (All Grown Up!)
 "Bad Blood" (Burn Notice)
 "Bad Blood" (Degrassi High)
 "Bad Blood" (Doctor Who Confidential)
 "Bad Blood" (The Dresden Files)
 "Bad Blood" (Foyle's War)
 "Bad Blood" (Grey's Anatomy)
 "Bad Blood" (Haven)
 "Bad Blood" (Hit the Floor)
 "Bad Blood" (Law & Order: Special Victims Unit)
 "Bad Blood" (Legends of Tomorrow)
 "Bad Blood" (Once Upon a Time in Wonderland)
 "Bad Blood" (Prison Break)
 "Bad Blood" (Robin Hood)
 "Bad Blood" (Teenage Mutant Ninja Turtles)
 "Bad Blood" (True Blood)
 "Bad Blood" (Will & Grace)
 "Bad Blood" (The X-Files)

Literature
 Bad Blood (Buffy comic), a 1999–2000 Buffy the Vampire Slayer comic
 Bad Blood (Sage book), a 2000 memoir by Lorna Sage
 Bad Blood: Secrets and Lies in a Silicon Valley Startup, a 2018 nonfiction book about Theranos by John Carreyrou
 Bad Blood: A Walk Along the Irish Border, a 1987 book by Colm Tóibín
 Hellblazer Special: Bad Blood, a 2000 Hellblazer comic book limited series
 Bad Blood, a volume in the Creation Cinema series
 Bad Blood, a 1981 history of the Tuskegee syphilis experiment by James Jones
 Bad Blood, a 2007 novel by Rhiannon Lassiter
 Bad Blood, a 2010 Virgil Flowers novel by John Sandford
 Bad Blood, a 2010 Being Human novel by James Goss
 Bad Blood, a chapter of the 1993 novel Trainspotting by Irvine Welsh

Music

Albums 
 Bad Blood (Bastille album) or the title song (see below), 2013
 Bad Blood (Blood on the Dance Floor album) or the title song, 2013
 Bad Blood (Gerling album) or the title song, 2003
 Bad Blood (Ice album), 1998
 Bad Blood, by Peter Dolving, 2003

Songs 
 "Bad Blood" (Bastille song), 2012
 "Bad Blood" (Ministry song), 1999
 "Bad Blood" (Neil Sedaka song), 1975
 "Bad Blood" (Siobhan Fahey song), 2005
 "Bad Blood" (Supergrass song), 2008
 "Bad Blood" (Taylor Swift song), 2014
 "Bad Blood", by Amorphis from Under the Red Cloud, 2015
 "Bad Blood", by the Bonzo Dog Band from Let's Make Up and Be Friendly, 1972
 "Bad Blood", by Boy George and Culture Club from Life, 2018
 "Bad Blood", by Bright Eyes from Noise Floor (Rarities: 1998–2005), 2006
 "Bad Blood", by Doro from Angels Never Die, 1993
 "Bad Blood", by Escape the Fate from This War Is Ours, 2008
 "Bad Blood", by Europe from Prisoners in Paradise, 1991
 "Bad Blood", by Jess Glynne from I Cry When I Laugh, 2015
 "Bad Blood", by Phinehas from Thegodmachine, 2011
 "Bad Blood", by Radical Face from The Family Tree: The Leaves, 2016
 "Bad Blood", by Simian Mobile Disco from Temporary Pleasure, 2009
 "Bad Blood", by Ten Years After from About Time, 1989

Video games 
 Bad Blood (video game), a 1990 action role-playing game
 Dying Light: Bad Blood, a 2018 multiplayer expansion of Dying Light

Other uses 
 Bad blood, a name in the U.S. South for various illnesses including syphilis, anemia, and fatigue; see Tuskegee syphilis experiment

See also 
 Blood feud